Alimemazine (INN), also known as trimeprazine, (brand names Nedeltran, Panectyl, Repeltin, Therafene, Theraligene, Theralen, Theralene, Vallergan, Vanectyl, and Temaril), commonly provided as a tartrate salt, is a phenothiazine derivative that is used as an antipruritic (it prevents itching from causes such as eczema or poison ivy, by acting as an antihistamine). It also acts as a sedative, hypnotic, and antiemetic for prevention of motion sickness. Although it is structurally related to drugs such as chlorpromazine, it is not used as an antipsychotic. In the Russian Federation, it is marketed under the brand name Teraligen for the treatment of anxiety disorders (including GAD), organic mood disorders, sleep disturbances, personality disorders accompanied by asthenia and depression, somatoform autonomic dysfunction and various neuroses.

Alimemazine is not approved for use in humans in the United States. The combination of alimemazine and prednisolone (commonly sold under the brand name Temaril-P) is licensed as an antipruritic and antitussive in dogs.

References 

Antiemetics
Phenothiazines
H1 receptor antagonists